Novostroyevka-Pervaya is a rural locality (a selo) and the administrative center of Novostroyevskoye Rural Settlement, Grayvoronsky District, Belgorod Oblast, Russia. The population was 646 as of 2010. There are 2 streets.

Geography 
Novostroyevka-Pervaya is located 8 km southeast of Grayvoron (the district's administrative centre) by road. Grayvoron is the nearest rural locality.

References 

Rural localities in Grayvoronsky District